The Gulf smooth-hound (Mustelus sinusmexicanus) is a houndshark of the family Triakidae, found on the continental shelves of the tropical western central Atlantic. The reproduction of this houndshark is placental viviparous.

Description
This species has a long slender body, a plain grey/brown dorsum, pale/white ventrum and a large and rounded dorsal fin. The fins have a pale to white trailing margin fading towards adulthood. The caudal fin is deeply notched; its teeth are flat and pale. This type of shark can be found in the continental shelf between depths of 36 m to 229 m. The maximum recorded size was 140 cm.

References

External links

 

Mustelus
Ovoviviparous fish
Fish of the Gulf of Mexico
Fish described in 1997